Gaute Nepstad (born 9 September 1994 in Bergen) is a Norwegian curler from Ottestad in the Hamar area. He plays lead on the 2022 Norwegian champion Magnus Ramsfjell team from Trondheim. He currently lives and studies in Trondheim.

Curling career
Nepstad began curling at the age of 11, when he and his friends wanted to try the sport. He played on a frozen association football pitch in Ottestad, near his childhood home. Eventually, he started travelling to a club in Lillehammer with better ice conditions. In 2009, he was the runner-up at the Norwegian U17 boys championship. 

Nepstad was a member the Norwegian junior men's team at the 2013, 2014 and 2015 World Junior Curling Championships. 
In 2013 and 2014, the team was skipped by Eirik Mjøen. In 2013, Nepstad was the alternate on the team, but played in five games. The team finished in 5th place. In 2014, Nepstad played lead on the team. After finishing the round robin in first place with a 7–2 record, the team lost the semifinal to Switzerland, but won the bronze medal game against Canada. In 2015, Nepstad skipped the team, but threw lead rocks. He led his team of Markus Skogvold, Martin Sesaker and Wilhelm Naess to a 4–5 record, finishing in sixth place. That year, Nepstad won the WJCC Sportsmanship Award. After juniors, Nepstad stopped curling for awhile.  

In 2019, Nepstead played lead on Team Norway at the 2019 Winter Universiade, on a team skipped by Magnus Ramsfjell. The team went on to win the gold medal.

The Magnus Ramsfjell rink, with Nepstad throwing lead stones won the 2022 Norwegian Men's Curling Championship. It was Nepstad's first national men's championship. The team was chosen to represent Norway at the 2022 World Men's Curling Championship, where they finished in 10th with a 5–7 record. That season, the team also won the 2021 Prague Classic World Curling Tour event.

References

External links
 Profile on CurlingZone
 World Curling Federation Profile

Living people
1994 births
Norwegian male curlers
Universiade medalists in curling
Universiade gold medalists for Norway
Competitors at the 2019 Winter Universiade
Sportspeople from Bergen
Sportspeople from Hamar
People from Stange
Sportspeople from Trondheim
21st-century Norwegian people